HMS Frederick William was an 86-gun screw-propelled first-rate ship of the line of the Royal Navy.

She was initially ordered from Portsmouth Dockyard on 12 September 1833 as a 110-gun Queen-class ship of the line, under the name HMS Royal Sovereign. The order was suspended on 7 May 1834, but was later renewed, this time under the name HMS Royal Frederick, a change in name which took place on 12 April 1839. She was laid down on 1 July 1841, but work commenced slowly, and on 29 June 1848 she was re-ordered to a modification of the Queen-class design, still powered by sails alone. The order for the still unfinished ship was again modified on 28 February 1857, when it was ordered that she be completed as an 86-gun screw battleship. Conversion work began on 28 May 1859, and the ship was renamed HMS Frederick William on 28 January 1860, shortly before her launch on 24 March that year. She was completed in June 1860.

From 1 July to 31 December 1864, she served as a Coast Guard Service Home Station, at Portland, replacing . On 19 October 1876 she was renamed as Worcester, to take on a new role as a training ship at Greenhithe for the Thames Nautical Training College. She fulfilled this role until her sale in July 1948. She foundered in the River Thames on 30 August 1948. She was raised in May 1953 and was broken up.

References

External links
 

1860 ships
Ships built in Portsmouth
Victorian-era ships of the line of the United Kingdom
Ships of the line of the Royal Navy